Greenleaf is an American television drama series, created by Craig Wright, which premiered June 21, 2016, on the Oprah Winfrey Network (OWN).
The series follows the unscrupulous world of the Greenleaf family (Bishop James Greenleaf, his wife Lady Mae, and their once-estranged daughter Grace) with scandalous secrets and lies, and their sprawling Memphis megachurch with predominantly African-American members.

During the course of the series, 60 episodes of Greenleaf aired, between June 21, 2016, and August 11, 2020.

Series overview

Episodes

Season 1 (2016)

Season 2 (2017)

Season 3 (2018)

Season 4 (2019)

Season 5 (2020)

Ratings

References

External links

Greenleaf